The Wyckoff Bjerg Formation is a geologic formation in Greenland. It preserves fossils dating back to the Cambrian period.

See also 

 List of fossiliferous stratigraphic units in Greenland

References

External links 
 

Geologic formations of Greenland
Cambrian Greenland
Cambrian southern paleotemperate deposits